Khorram Makan Rural District is a rural district (dehestan) in Kamfiruz District, Marvdasht County, Fars Province, Iran. At the 2006 census, its population was 8,766, in 1,716 families.  The rural district has 14 villages.

References 

Rural Districts of Fars Province
Marvdasht County